Bathymophila euspira is a species of sea snail, a marine gastropod mollusk in the family Solariellidae.

Description
The height of the shell attains 7 mm. The conical shell is elevated, with a rather obtuse apex. It is shining and pearly white. It contains five whorls. The nucleus is translucent, white, and with a sculpture of strong revolving threads, of which that nearest to the suture is most pronounced, and continues, at first sharp, then with slight waves, then with oblique waves like the lay of a stranded rope. On the body whorl there is a succession of well-elevated pinched-up points forming a band next the suture. The others disappear on the third whorl, and for the rest the shell is only marked by faint lines of growth here and there, a little more pronounced in the vicinity of the umbilical callus. The periphery has a tendency to carination. The base of the shell is rounded. The oblique aperture is rounded with a sharp margin. The simple columella is stout, thick, inseparable from a thick white callus which forms a lump over the umbilical pit. The end of the columella (broken in specimens seen so far) apparently form a sort of lump or thickened angle. The suture is distinct throughout.

Distribution
This species occurs in the following locations at depths between 713 m and 1472 m:
 Caribbean Sea
 Cuba, Puerto Rico
 Gulf of Mexico

References

 Dall, W. H. 1881. Reports on the results of dredging, under the supervision of Alexander Agassiz, in the Gulf of Mexico, and in the Caribbean Sea, 1877–79, by the United States Coast Survey Steamer 'Blake,'. Bulletin of the Museum of Comparative Zoology 9: 33–144.
 Rosenberg, G., F. Moretzsohn, and E. F. García. 2009. Gastropoda (Mollusca) of the Gulf of Mexico, Pp. 579–699 in Felder, D.L. and D.K. Camp (eds.), Gulf of Mexico–Origins, Waters, and Biota. Biodiversity. Texas A&M Press, College Station, Texas

External links
 To World Register of Marine Species

euspira
Gastropods described in 1881